Khor may refer to:
 Al Khor, a town in Qatar
 Khor, an ancient region in Syria
Khor, Jawad, a village in India
 Khor (river), a river in Russia
 Khor, Khabarovsk Krai, an urban-type settlement in Russia
 Khor, the fictional currency of Syldavia

See also 
Al Khawr (disambiguation)

ru:Хор (значения)